Kenneth O. Bantum is an American former professional basketball player. He is a native of Roosevelt, New York, and graduated from Holy Trinity High School in Hicksville, New York. Bantum played college basketball for the Cornell Big Red from 1981 to 1985. He was the first Cornell player to be named the Ivy League Player of the Year when he won the award in 1985. Bantum set the Big Red all-time career scoring record with 1,411 points. He was named to the All-Ivy League first-team in 1985 and second-team in 1984.

Bantum was selected in the seventh round of the 1985 NBA draft by the New York Knicks and was the first Cornell player drafted into the NBA since 1968. He joined the Indiana Pacers for rookie camp in 1986 but was cut from the team. Bantum played for Södertälje BBK in the Swedish Basketball League.

Bantum was inducted into the Cornell Athletics Hall of Fame in 1990.

References

External links
 College statistics

Year of birth missing (living people)
Living people
American expatriate basketball people in Sweden
American men's basketball players
Basketball players from New York (state)
Centers (basketball)
Cornell Big Red men's basketball players
New York Knicks draft picks
People from Roosevelt, New York